The 2007 Stratford-on-Avon District Council election took place on 3 May 2007 to elect members of Stratford-on-Avon District Council in Warwickshire, England. One third of the council was up for election and the Conservative Party stayed in overall control of the council.

After the election, the composition of the council was
Conservative 37
Liberal Democrat 14
Independent 2

Election result
The results of the election were delayed after problems with the electronic counting system led to the count being suspended and then resumed later manually. When the results were declared the Conservatives increased their majority on the council after making 5 gains among the 18 seats that were being contested.

Ward results

References

2007 English local elections
2007
2000s in Warwickshire